First Time is a 2010 Philippine television drama romance series broadcast by GMA Network. Directed by Andoy Ranay, it stars Barbie Forteza, Joshua Dionisio and Jake Vargas. It premiered on February 8, 2010 on the network's Telebabad line up replacing Ikaw Sana. The series concluded on May 28, 2010 with a total of 78 episodes. It was replaced by Langit sa Piling Mo in its timeslot.

The series is streaming online on YouTube.

Cast and characters

Lead cast
 Barbie Forteza as Cyndi Gomez
 Joshua Dionisio as Lukas Ynfante
 Jake Vargas as Sebastian "Baste" Luna

Supporting cast
 Bea Binene as Natalie Dimaculangan
 Jhoana Marie Tan as Sara Santiago
 Lucho Ayala as Jimbo Dimaculangan
 Mark Elliot Castillo as Daniel Olivia
 Gracie Henson as Patty Montalban
 Joyce Ching as Bea
 Mac Castillo as Nathan
 Eugene Domingo as Barbarella Buncalan Jackson
 Michelle Madrigal as Valeria Gomez
 Joross Gamboa as Ted
 Ian Veneracion as Robert Gomez
 Ana Capri as Hilda Gomez
 Cris Villanueva as Ben Gomez
 Angel Jacob as Olive Ynfante
 Eric Quizon as Jaime Ynfante
 Manilyn Reynes as Laura Luna
 Romnick Sarmenta as Marcelo "Marcel" Luna
 Bayani Agbayani as Raffy Santiago
 Shiela Marie Rodriguez as Doris Santiago
 Alicia Mayer as the fake Ms. Dimaculangan
 Mel Kimura as Ms. Ida
 Ricci Chan as Pete
 Roxanne Barcelo as Ms. Berna
 Peter Serrano as Oh
 Harlene Bautista-Sarmenta as Teresa Chavez

Recurring cast
 Anna Vicente as Belle 
 Carmi Martin as Ms. Dimaculangan 
 Patrick Suelto as Josh Goretti
 Tricia Andrews as Hannah
 Emsi Nightmare as Mary Christine

Controversy
On May 11, 2010, director Andoy Ranay reportedly insulted Jake Vargas during the production. Vargas' then-manager, German Moreno, rushed to the set and confronted Ranay for his actions.

Ratings
According to AGB Nielsen Philippines' Mega Manila household television ratings, the pilot episode of First Time earned a 22.5% rating.

References

External links
 

2010 Philippine television series debuts
2010 Philippine television series endings
2010s high school television series
Filipino-language television shows
GMA Network drama series
Philippine romance television series
Television series about teenagers
Television shows set in the Philippines